Events from the year 1949 in Denmark.

Incumbents
 Monarch – Frederick IX
 Prime minister – Hans Hedtoft

Events
 30 March – Prince Harald, uncle of King Frederick IX, dies in Copenhagen at age 72, following two years of illness.

Sport

Badminton
 5 March  Tonny Ahm wins gold in Women's Single at the All England Badminton Championships.

Cycling
 2228 August  The 1949 UCI Track Cycling World Championships are held in Copenhagen.
 Knud Andersen wins gold in Men's individual pursuit.

Football
 KB wins the 1948–49 Danish 1st Division. It is their 10th Danish football championship.

Births
 27 March – Poul Ruders, composer
 22 April – Per Bak Jensen, photographer
 14 August – Morten Olsen, football player
 5 October – Thomas Clausen, jazz pianist

Deaths
 6 March – Robert Storm Petersen, cartoonist, painter, inventor, writer (born 1882)
 30 March – Prince Harald, royal, army officer (born 1876)
 27 May – Martin Knudsen, physicist and researcher after whom the Knudsen gas state, the Knudsen number, and the Knudsen layer are named (born 1871)
 28 June – Laurits Larsen, Olympic sport shooter and bronze medalist (born 1872)
 13 September – August Krogh, professor at the department of zoophysiology at the University of Copenhagen 1916–1945, recipient of the Nobel Prize in Physiology or Medicine in 1920 (born 1874)
 28 September – Nancy Dalberg, composer (born 1881)
 12 November – Christian Schmiegelow, businessman (born 1859)

References

 
Denmark
Years of the 20th century in Denmark
1940s in Denmark
1949 in Europe